Daviesia smithiorum is a species of flowering plant in the family Fabaceae and is endemic to the south-west of Western Australia. It is an erect, glabrous, spindly shrub with scattered tapering, needle-shaped phyllodes and yellow-orange and red flowers.

Description

Taxonomy
Daviesia smithiorum was first formally described in 1995 by Michael Crisp in Australian Systematic Botany from specimens collected in 1987 by Basil Smith of Manmanning in the Dowerin-Wyalkatchem area. The specific epithet (smithiorum) honours Basil and Mary Smith of Manmanning.

Distribution and habitat
This daviesia grows in heath in the Dowerin-Wyalkatchem in the Avon Wheatbelt biogeographic region of south-western Western Australia.

Conservation status 
Daviesia smithiorum is listed as "not threatened" by the Government of Western Australia Department of Biodiversity, Conservation and Attractions.

References 

smithiorum
Taxa named by Michael Crisp
Plants described in 1995
Flora of Western Australia